Joan Carol Gratz (born 1941) is an American artist, animator, and filmmaker who specializes in clay painting. Gratz is best known for her 1992 Oscar-winning animated short film Mona Lisa Descending a Staircase.

Early life 
In 1941, Gratz was born in Burbank, California. Gratz's father was an electrical engineer her mother was an English teacher. From a young age she had an interest in art.

Education 
While Gratz was a student in architecture, she began painting. Gratz  was filming her painting process. In 1969, Gratz obtained a degree in professional architecture at the University of California, Los Angeles. Before graduating, Gratz began to experiment with the possibilities of animation and started to explore the idea of "making paintings breathe" with a technique she explained as "clay painting". After graduating, she moved to Oregon, making a living by creating puppets and poster graphics.

Career 
In 1976, Gratz was asked to work for Will Vinton in the new up and coming Will Vinton Studios, and began working in the film industry during the production of Rip Van Winkle (1978). During her time at Vinton Studios, Gratz worked on many films as an animator, but in 1987 she decided to work as a freelance animator and filmmaker due to issues involved with collaborative film projects, and not receiving the proper credit for her work.
In 1987, Gratz established Gratzfilm, her own studio to direct and produce her films.

Once a freelance animator and filmmaker, Gratz continued to be represented by Vinton Studio, and her success led her to receive commissions for commercials from large companies such as Coca-Cola. In 1990, Gratz animated a commercial for United Airlines entitled Natural, which consisted of her clay painting technique.

After eight years of planning and researching, and two years of working through the creation and animation process, Gratz completed her film Mona Lisa Descending a Staircase in 1992. The title of this seven minute long film combines the titles of Leonardo DaVinci's famous painting, the Mona Lisa (1503), and Marcel Duchamp's iconic modernist piece, Nude Descending a Staircase, No. 2 (1919).
 Consisting of fifty-five twentieth-century paintings, Gratz uses her clay painting technique to present her audience with the history and evolution of modern art, beginning with Impressionism, and continuing until the Pop Art movement and Hyperrealism through metamorphic transitions between each work of art. The sound and music for the film were provided by composer Jamie Haggerty and Chel White. It won the 1992 Academy Award for Best Animated Short Film, and won many other awards at various film festivals around the world.

In 1993, Gratz co-directed and animated Pro and Con with Joanne Priestly. Using mixed media including writing and calligraphy, and creating through black clay on white backgrounds, Pro and Con illustrates a docudrama about prison life seen through the eyes of a prisoner and a corrections officer.

Gratz is also an author. In June 2014, Gratz was a writer and illustrator of My Tesla: A love story of a mouse and her car, a disguised children book for adults.

Accolades
At the Academy Awards, Mona Lisa Descending a Staircase (1992) won an Oscar for the Best Animated Short Film in 1993.

Filmography

Director and producer 
 1988 Candyjam - Director
 1992 Mona Lisa Descending a Staircase - Director 
 1993 Pro and Con (co-director)
 2010 Kubla Kan 
 2014 Lost and Found
 2016 Primal Flux - Director
 2020 No Leaders Please - Director

As animator 
 Rip Van Winkle (1978) 
 Legacy: A Very Short History of Natural Resources (1979)
 The Little Prince (1979)
 Dinosaur (1980)
 A Christmas Gift (1980)
 The Creation (1981) 
 Candyjam (1988)
 Kubla Kan (2010)
 Lost and Found (2014)
 No Leaders Please (2020)

See also 
 Clay painting
 Loving Vincent, a 2013 animated film similar in technique
 Will Vinton

References

External links
 
 Joan C. Gratz at mostlymovies.ca
 Joan C. Gratz at austinchronicle.com
 
 Women in Animation: Joan C Gratz Part 1

Animators from California
American animated film directors
American women film directors
American women film producers
American women animators
Clay animators
American animated film producers
People from Burbank, California
University of California, Los Angeles alumni
Living people
Directors of Best Animated Short Academy Award winners
1941 births
Film directors from California
Film producers from California
21st-century American women